The 2011 Big East baseball tournament was held from May 25 through 29, 2011. It was an eight-team double elimination tournament.   was their third tournament championship and claimed the league's automatic bid to the 2011 NCAA Division I baseball tournament.

Format and seeding
The  Big East baseball tournament was an 8 team double elimination tournament in 2009. The top eight regular season finishers were seeded one through eight based on conference winning percentage only.  The field was divided into two brackets, with the winners of each bracket meeting in a single championship game.

Bracket

 ~ Game went to extra innings
 ^ Game ended after 8 innings because of mercy rule

All-Tournament Team
The following players were named to the All-Tournament team.

Jack Kaiser Award
Joe DiRocco was the winner of the 2011 Jack Kaiser Award. DiRocco was a senior pitcher for Seton Hall.

References

Tournament
Big East Conference Baseball Tournament
Big East Conference baseball tournament
Big East Conference baseball tournament
College baseball tournaments in Florida
Baseball competitions in Clearwater, Florida